Blue Lick is an unincorporated community in Saline County, in the U.S. state of Missouri.

History
A post office called Blue Lick was established in 1890, and remained in operation until 1934. The community was named after nearby Blue Lick Springs.

References

Unincorporated communities in Saline County, Missouri
Unincorporated communities in Missouri